Georgios Venieris (born 1926) was a Greek rower. He competed in the men's coxed pair event at the 1948 Summer Olympics.

References

External links
 

1926 births
Possibly living people
Greek male rowers
Olympic rowers of Greece
Rowers at the 1948 Summer Olympics